Hell Baby is a 2013 American horror-comedy film written and directed by Robert Ben Garant and Thomas Lennon. The film stars Rob Corddry, Leslie Bibb, Keegan-Michael Key, Riki Lindhome, Rob Huebel, and Paul Scheer. Writer-directors Garant and Lennon also co-star as a pair of priests.

The film premiered at the Sundance Film Festival on January 20, 2013. The film is available on VOD beginning on July 25, 2013 before its theatrical release on September 6, 2013.

Plot
An expectant couple move into a haunted fixer-upper in New Orleans. There, they encounter a neighbour named F'resnel who tells them about the bloody history of their house.

Vanessa and her husband, Jack, exhibiting a certain carelessness in their house hunting, buy a foreboding wreck of a place in New Orleans that the local residents have given demonic nicknames like "House of Blood". Vanessa is already extremely pregnant when they move in, and soon she is talking like Regan from The Exorcist. The Vatican sends ghost hunters, Father Padrigo and Father Sebastian.

Cast

Reception
On review aggregator Rotten Tomatoes, the film holds an approval rating of 31% based on 39 reviews, with an average rating of 4.43/10. The website's critics consensus reads: "Though its brand of immature comedy may appeal to some, Hell Baby misses the mark with much of its humor, rendering it a largely ineffective -- and often crass -- genre sendup." On Metacritic, the film has a weighted average score of 41 out of 100, based on 15 critics, indicating "mixed or average reviews".

Badass Digest called the movie "silly, lowbrow, and funny." CraveOnline called it a "triumph of independence" and a "genuinely hilarious farce." TheDissolve said, "Hell Baby falls unmistakably on the "comedy" side of the horror-comedy divide. It isn't overly concerned with being scary, just with delivering a steady stream of laughs."

Deadline Hollywood reported that the movie was acquired by Millennium Films for U.S. Distribution and was slated to be released in the Fall of 2013.

References

External links
 

2010s English-language films
2013 films
2013 comedy horror films
American comedy horror films
Demons in film
Films about exorcism
Films directed by Robert Ben Garant
Films set in New Orleans
American supernatural horror films
American pregnancy films
2013 comedy films
American haunted house films
2010s American films